The Marquette Bungalows Historic District is a historic district located in Madison, Wisconsin, United States, that is listed on the National Register of Historic Places.

Description
"This district contains two blocks of bungalow-style homes in the Marquette neighborhood and is roughly bounded from Spaight St. to Rutledge St. and S. Dickinson St. to S. Thornton Ave. These bungalows sprouted up between 1924 and 1930 sharing similar shapes and sizes, although each home has certain details and features that make them unique. The size of these homes are not very large, but the quality of details and construction were superb. Many of these homes have wood flooring, fine woodworking throughout, built-in cabinets, and leaded glass windows. The Madison Landmarks Commission declared the Marquette Bungalows a historical district in 1993."

History
Contributing buildings in the district were constructed from 1924 to 1930.

The district was declared a historic district by the Madison Landmarks Commission in 1993 and was added to the National Register of Historic Places April 14, 1997.

See also

 National Register of Historic Places listings in Madison, Wisconsin

References

External links

Houses on the National Register of Historic Places in Wisconsin
Houses in Madison, Wisconsin
Geography of Dane County, Wisconsin
National Register of Historic Places in Madison, Wisconsin